Habibpur railway station is a railway station of the Kolkata Suburban Railway system and operated by Eastern Railway. It is situated at Mahishya para, Raghabpur, Habibpur on the Ranaghat–Shantipur line in Nadia district in the Indian state of West Bengal. This railway station serves Ranaghat I and Habibpur area.

History
The line including Habibpur railway station was doubled in 2014–15 and electrified in 1963–64.

References 

Sealdah railway division
Railway stations in Nadia district
Kolkata Suburban Railway stations